Qualification of the 1986 AFC U-16 Championship.

Groups

Group 1
The group consisted of Saudi Arabia, Syria and North Yemen, with matches played in Damascus, Syria.

Saudi Arabia qualified for the final tournament.

Group 2

Group 3
The group consisted Bangladesh, Nepal, Iran, with matches played in Tehran, Iran.

Bangladesh qualified for the final tournament.

Group 4
The group only consisted of Myanmar and India, with only one match played.

Group 5
The group consisted of Indonesia, Malaysia, Singapore, Thailand, with matches played in Jakarta, Indonesia.

Indonesia qualified for the final tournament.

Group 6
The group consisted of China, Hong Kong, North Korea, with matches played in Victoria, Hong Kong.

North Korea qualified for the final tournament.

Group 7
The group consisted of Philippines, Japan, South Korea, with matches played in Nagoya, Japan, in August 1986. It is known that South Korea beat Philippines and Japan both by 2–0.

South Korea qualified for the final tournament.

External links
RSSSF

1986 AFC U-16 Championship
AFC U-16 Championship qualification